Joel L. Carey is a United States Air Force major general who serves as Director of Operations, Strategic Deterrence, and Nuclear Integration of U.S. Air Forces in Europe – Air Forces Africa since June 2022. He most recently served as the Deputy Chief of Staff for Operations of the Allied Air Command and before that he was the commander of the 18th Wing and, prior to that, the vice commander of the Fifth Air Force.

In May 2022, Carey was nominated for promotion to major general.

Honours 
  Order of the Rising Sun, 3rd Class, Gold Rays with Neck Ribbon (2022)

References

External links
 

Year of birth missing (living people)
Living people
Place of birth missing (living people)
United States Air Force generals
Recipients of the Order of the Rising Sun, 3rd class